The 1977 Texas–Arlington Mavericks football team was an American football team that represented the University of Texas at Arlington in the Southland Conference during the 1977 NCAA Division I football season. In their fourth year under head coach Harold Elliott, the team compiled a 5–6 record.

Schedule

Roster

References

Texas–Arlington
Texas–Arlington Mavericks football seasons
Texas–Arlington Mavericks football